Shane Nicholson is an Australian singer-songwriter from Brisbane. He has released 11 albums, both in Australia and internationally, and has won 3 ARIA Awards, 15 Golden Guitars, and 2 APRA Awards. He's twice been named Producer of the Year at the Country Music Awards of Australia.

Career

1990s–2001: Freak and Pretty Violet Stain
During his final year of high school, Nicholson was part of a band called Freak, which won an early round of Triple J Unearthed competition in the Sunshine Coast division. Shortly after this, the band name changed to Pretty Violet Stain and released an extended play in 1997 called Blush. This was followed by singles "If the Money's Right", "Never Come Down" and "Talk" and album Parachutes and Gravity, which was released in 2000. The band split shortly after.

2002–2007: It's a Movie and Faith and Science
Nicholson signed with EastWest and released his debut studio album It's a Movie in 2002. It was during the recording of this album with Nash Chambers that Nicholson met Kasey Chambers. The two dueted on the lead single, "Designed to Fade".

He toured in Australia and made his United States debut at the South by Southwest Festival, which prompted his signing with Virt Records and a more extensive American tour. USA Today named It's a Movie one of the top pop albums of 2004.

A second solo album, Faith and Science, was released in 2006 and included the single "I Know What You Need", which became his first charting single, peaking at number 54.

2008–2013: Albums with Kasey Chambers, Familiar Ghosts and Bad Machines

Nicholson joined with wife Kasey Chambers for the album Rattlin' Bones, which was released in April 2008 and debuted at number 1 on the ARIA charts. At the ARIA Music Awards of 2008, it won ARIA Award for Best Country Album. The album won five Golden Guitar Awards at the Country Music Awards of Australia (CMAA) in January 2009.

Between tours he recorded a third solo album, Familiar Ghosts, which was released in November 2008 and was nominated for an Best Country Album at the ARIA Music Awards of 2009. This coincided with Nicholson moving into music production. 
 
In March 2011, Nicholson released his sixth solo album, Bad Machines, which peaked at number 29. Nicholson and his wife welcomed a baby girl on 6 October 2011, named Poet Poppin Nicholson.

At the January 2012 CMAA, Nicholson won the Song of the Year for his song, "Bad Machines". Also in 2012, Nicholson won the APRA Country Work of the Year award for "Famous Last Words".

In September 2012, Nicholson and Chambers released a second collaborative album, Wreck & Ruin was peaked at number 6 on the ARIA Charts. The album was nominated for 5 awards at the 2013 CMAA awards, ultimately winning the couple the award for "Group/Duo of the Year". At the ARIA Music Awards of 2013, the album won Best Country Album. Nicholson was named Producer of the Year at the 2013 Country Music Awards of Australia.

On 23 April 2013, it was announced that Nicholson and Kasey Chambers had separated, with the collision of work and family life said to have forced their split.

2014–2020: Hell Breaks Loose and Love and Blood

In 2014, Nicholson signed a new recording deal with Lost Highway Australia/Universal Music, and released his first live album, Pitch, Roll & Yaw – Live and Solo.

June 2015 saw the release of "Secondhand Man", the first single from Nicholson's album Hell Breaks Loose. The album was written amongst the break up of this married to Chambers. Released in August 2015, it debuted at No. 16 on the ARIA chart.

Hell Breaks Loose won the ARIA award for Best Country Album at the ARIA Music Awards of 2015 and received 7 CMAA nominations at the 2016 CMAA awards. The album won Alternative Country Album of the Year Award.

Love and Blood was released in July 2017 and debuted at No. 28 on the ARIA chart. It was nominated for Best Country Album at the ARIA Music Awards of 2017. At the CMAA in January 2018, Nicholson won Male Artist of the Year.

Nicholson appeared as an on-camera music producer in ABC television production of The Recording Studio, a 10-part series that ran in April 2019. The music from the series won the 2019 ARIA Award for Best Original Soundtrack, Cast or Show Album.

In May 2019, Nicholson was signed a publishing deal with Cooking Vinyl Australia.

On 3 April 2020, Nicholson confirmed the digital reissued of his back-catalogue.

2021: Living in Colour

In July 2021, Nicholson announced the release of his forthcoming studio album, Living in Colour. The album was released on 20 August 2021. August also saw the release of Camille Trail's album River of Sin which Nicholson had produced. It debuted at #34 on the ARIA Country Music Charts, and #5 on the ARIA Australian Country Music Charts.

Personal life
On 17 December 2005 Nicholson married fellow country music singer-songwriter, Kasey Chambers. In 2002, Chambers sung on Nicholson's debut solo album "Designed to Fade", which was produced by Kasey's brother, Nash. Subsequently, they co-released two albums, Rattlin' Bones (2008) and Wreck & Ruin (2012). Chambers and Nicholson have two children: son Arlo Ray (2007) and daughter Poet Poppin (2011). In April 2013 the couple announced their separation.

Discography

Albums

Studio albums

Soundtrack albums

Live albums

Compilation albums

EPs

Singles
{| class="wikitable plainrowheaders" style="text-align:center"
|+ List of singles, with selected chart positions
! scope="col" rowspan="2"| Title
! scope="col" rowspan="2"| Year
! scope="col" colspan="1"| Peak chart positions
! scope="col" rowspan="2"| Album
|-
! style="width:3em; font-size:85%;"| AUS
|-
! scope="row"| "Designed to Fade" 
| 2002
| —
| rowspan="2"| It's a Movie
|-
! scope="row"| "I Wish I Was You (Sometimes)"
| 2003
| —
|-
! scope="row"| "I Know What You Need" 
| 2006
| 54
| rowspan="2"| Faith & Science
|-
! scope="row"| "Safe and Sound"
| 2007
| —
|-
! scope="row"| "Rattlin' Bones"  
| rowspan="3"| 2008
| 55
| rowspan="2"| Rattlin' Bones
|-
! scope="row"| "Monkey on a Wire" 
| —
|-
! scope="row"| "Summer Dress"
| —
| Familiar Ghosts
|-
! scope="row"| "Wildflower" 
| rowspan="2"| 2009
| —
| Rattlin' Bones
|-
! scope="row"| "Where the Water Goes"
| —
| Familiar Ghosts
|-
! scope="row"| "Bad Machines" 
| 2010
| —
| rowspan="4"| Bad Machines
|-
! scope="row"| "Famous Last Words" 
| rowspan="3"| 2011
| —
|-
! scope="row"| "Whistling Cannonballs"  
| —
|-
! scope="row"| "Jimmie Rodgers Was a Vampire"
| —
|-
! scope="row"| "Adam & Eve" 
| rowspan="2"| 2012
| —
| rowspan="3"| Wreck & Ruin
|-
! scope="row"| "The Quiet Life" 
| —
|-
! scope="row"| "Wreck & Ruin" 
| 2013
| —
|-
! scope="row"| "Secondhand Man"
| rowspan="2"| 2015
| —
| rowspan="3"| Hell Breaks Loose 
|-
! scope="row"| "When the Money's All Gone"
| —
|-
! scope="row"| "Weight of the World"
| 2016
| —
|-
! scope="row"| "Safe"
| rowspan="3"| 2017 
| —
| rowspan="3"| Love and Blood 
|-
! scope="row"| "I Don't Dance"
| —
|-
! scope="row"| "Even If You Were the One"
| —
|-
! scope="row"| "As Above, So Below" 
| 2018
| —
| More Than Meets the Eye
|-
! scope="row"| "The High Price of Surviving"
| rowspan="3"| 2020
| —
| Living in Colour
|-
! scope="row"| "Long Way from Lonely" 
| —
| rowspan="2"  
|-
! scope="row"| "Don't Take John Prine"
| —
|-
! scope="row"| "Harvest On Vinyl"
| rowspan="3"| 2021
| —
| rowspan="3"| Living in Colour
|-
! scope="row"| "Life Ain't Fine"
| —
|-
! scope="row"| "And You Will Have Your Way"
| —
|-

Awards and nominations

AIR Awards
The Australian Independent Record Awards (commonly known informally as AIR Awards) is an annual awards night to recognise, promote and celebrate the success of Australia's Independent Music sector.

|-
| AIR Awards of 2011
|Bad Machines 
| Best Independent Artist
| 
|-

Americana Music Awards
The Americana Music Honors & Awards honours distinguished members of the music community. Nicholson has been nominated twice.

|-
| 2009
| Nicholson and Kasey Chambers
| Best Duo/ Group of the Year
| 
|-
| 2010
| "Rattlin' Bones" 
| Song of the Year
| 
|-

APRA Music Awards
The APRA Music Awards is annual awards ceremony that celebrate excellence in contemporary music, which honour the skills of member composers, songwriters and publishers who have achieved outstanding success in sales and airplay performance. Nicholson has won two awards from five nominations.

|-
| rowspan="2"| 2009
| rowspan="2"| "Rattlin Bones" 
| Song of the Year
| 
|-
| Country Work of the Year
| 
|-
| rowspan="3"| 2012
| rowspan="2"| "Bad Machines"
| Country Work of the Year
| 
|-
| Song of the Year
| 
|-
| Country Work of the Year
| "Famous Last Words"
| 
|-
|rowspan="2"| 2013 || "Adam and Eve" (Kasey Chambers and Shane Nicholson) ||rowspan="2"| Song of the Year || 
|-
| "The Quiet Life" (Kasey Chambers and Shane Nicholson) || 
|-
| rowspan="2"| 2016
| rowspan="2"| "Secondhand Man"
| Country Work of the Year
| 
|-
| Song of the Year 
| 
|-

ARIA Music Awards
The ARIA Music Awards is an annual awards ceremony that recognises excellence, innovation, and achievement across all genres of Australian music. Nicholson has won three awards from eleven nominations.

|-
| rowspan="3"| 2008
| rowspan="2"| Rattlin' Bones 
| Best Country Album
| 
|-
| Album of the Year
| 
|-
| Aaron Hayward & David Homer for Rattlin' Bones
| Best Cover Art
|  
|-
| rowspan="2"| 2009
| Rattlin' Bones Max Sessions 
| Best Music DVD
| 
|-
| Familiar Ghosts
| Best Country Album
| 
|-
| 2011
| Bad Machines
| Best Country Album
| 
|-
| rowspan="2"| 2013
| Wreck & Ruin 
| Best Country Album
| 
|-
| Glen Hannah for Wreck & Ruin 
| Best Cover Art
|  
|-
| rowspan="2"| 2015
| Hell Breaks Loose
| Best Country Album
| 
|-
| "Secondhand Man" (directed by Filmery)
| Best Video
| 
|-
| 2017
| Love and Blood
| Best Country Album
| 
|-
| 2021
| Living in Colour
| Best Country Album
| 
|-

Country Music Awards of Australia
The Country Music Awards of Australia (CMAA) (also known as the Golden Guitar Awards) is an annual awards night held in January during the Tamworth Country Music Festival, in Tamworth, New South Wales, celebrating recording excellence in the Australian country music industry. Nicholson has won fifteen awards.

|-
| rowspan="6"| 2009
| rowspan="2"| Rattlin' Bones 
| Album of the Year
| 
|-
| Highest Selling Album
| 
|-
| rowspan="3"| "Rattlin' Bones" 
| Song of the Year
| 
|-
| Single of the Year
| 
|-
| Video of the Year
| 
|-
| himself with Kasey Chambers
| Group/Duo of the Year
| 
|-
| rowspan="7"| 2012
| Bad Machines
| Album of the Year
| 
|-
| rowspan="3"| "Bad Machines"
| Song of the Year
| 
|-
| Single of the Year
| 
|-
| Male Artist of the Year
| 
|-
| "Whistling Cannonballs" 
| Vocal Collaboration of the Year
| 
|-
|"Famous Last Words"
| Video of the Year
| 
|-
| Songs & Pictures by Beccy Cole
| Producer of the Year
| 
|-
| rowspan="7"| 2013
| Wreck & Ruin 
| Album of the Year
| 
|-
| rowspan="4"| "Adam & Eve" 
| Group or Duo of the Year 
| 
|-
| Song of the Year 
| 
|-
| Single of the Year 
| 
|-
| Video of the Year 
| 
|-
| "Reach For You" 
| Vocal collaboration of the Year 
| 
|-
| himself
| Producer of the Year
| 
|-
| rowspan="8"| 2016
| rowspan="3"| Hell Breaks Loose
| Alternative Country Album of the Year
| 
|-
| Male Artist of the Year
| 
|-
| Top Selling Album of the Year
| 
|-
| rowspan="3"| "Secondhand Man"
| Song of the Year
| 
|-
| Single of the Year
| 
|-
| Video Clip of the Year
| 
|-
| "Hermannsburg"
| Heritage Song of the Year
| 
|-
| Producer of the Year
| Sweet Rebecca by Beccy Cole
| 
|-
| rowspan="4"| 2018
| rowspan="2"| Love and Blood
| Alternative Country Album of the Year
| 
|-
| Male Artist of the Year 
| 
|-
| rowspan="2"| "Safe"
| Single of the Year
| 
|-
| Song of the Year
| 
|-
| rowspan="2"| 2021
| rowspan="2"| "The High Price of Surviving"
| Song of the Year
| 
|-
| Video of the Year
| 
|-
| rowspan="4"| 2022
| rowspan="2"| Living in Colour
| Album of the Year
| 
|-
| Alt Country Album of the Year
| 
|-
| rowspan="2"| And You Will Have Your Way"
| Song of the Year
| 
|-
| Single of the Year
| 
|-
|2023
| "Wiser" (with Lyn Bowtell) || Vocal Collaboration of the Year || 
|-

Selected Production work

References

External links

Official site
[ Entry] at Allmusic

Living people
APRA Award winners
ARIA Award winners
Australian country singers
Year of birth missing (living people)